This is a list of National Historic Sites in Quebec City, Quebec.  There are 37 National Historic Sites in Quebec City and its enclaves, of which seven are administered by Parks Canada (identified below by the beaver icon .  The first National Historic Site to be designated in Quebec City was Fort Charlesbourg Royal in 1923.

Numerous National Historic Events also occurred in Quebec City, and are identified at places associated with them, using the same style of federal plaque which marks National Historic Sites. Several National Historic Persons are commemorated throughout the city in the same way. The markers do not indicate which designation—a Site, Event, or Person—a subject has been given.

National Historic Sites located elsewhere in Quebec are listed at National Historic Sites in Quebec, and, for Montreal, at National Historic Sites in Montreal.

This list uses names designated by the national Historic Sites and Monuments Board, which may differ from other names for these sites.

National Historic Sites

See also

History of Quebec City

References

 
Quebec City

History of Quebec City